Sarafina! is a South African musical by Mbongeni Ngema and Hugh Masekela depicting students involved in the Soweto Riots, in opposition to apartheid. It was also adapted into a 1992 film starring Whoopi Goldberg and Leleti Khumalo.
Sarafina! premiered on Broadway on 28 January 1988, at the Cort Theatre, and closed on 2 July 1989, after 597 performances and 11 previews. The musical was conceived and directed by Mbongeni Ngema, who also wrote the book. He wrote the music and lyrics alongside Hugh Masekela. The play was first presented at The Market Theatre, Johannesburg, South Africa, in June 1987. The cast included Leleti Khumalo as Sarafina.

Leleti Khumalo received a Tony Award nomination, Best Featured Actress in a Musical, as well as a NAACP Image Award for her Broadway theatre portrayal of the title character.  The production was also nominated for the Tony Award for: Best Musical, Best Original Score, Best Choreography, and Best Direction of a Musical.

The show presents a school uprising similar to the Soweto uprising on 16 June 1976. A narrator introduces several characters among them the schoolgirl activist Sarafina. Things get out of control when policemen shoot several pupils at the school. Nevertheless, the musical ends with a cheerful farewell show of pupils leaving school, which takes most of the second act.

The production of the play was chronicled in the documentary film Voices of Sarafina!. The Album of Sarafina includes the following songs:

1.Sarafina!

2.Lord's Prayer

3.Nkonyane Kandaba

4.Freedom is coming tomorrow

5.Sabela

6.Sechaba

7.Safa Saphel' Isizwe

8.Thank you Mama

9.Vuma Dlozi Lami

10.Lizobuya

11.One more time

External links
Internet Broadway database
https://www.youtube.com/watch?v=R-JWmAQRfKc

1987 musicals
All-Black cast Broadway shows
Apartheid in South Africa
Broadway musicals
South African musicals